Paraquilegia is a genus of flowering plants belonging to the family Ranunculaceae.

Its native range is Temperate Asia.

Species:

Paraquilegia altimurana 
Paraquilegia anemonoides 
Paraquilegia caespitosa 
Paraquilegia chionophila 
Paraquilegia gangotriana 
Paraquilegia microphylla 
Paraquilegia scabrifolia 
Paraquilegia uniflora

References

Ranunculaceae
Ranunculaceae genera